Toby Caulfeild (1750–1772) was an Irish politician.

Caulfeild was educated at  Trinity College, Dublin. He represented  Tulsk from 1771 to 1772.

References

1750 births
1772 deaths
Irish MPs 1769–1776
Members of the Parliament of Ireland (pre-1801) for County Roscommon constituencies
Alumni of Trinity College Dublin